A total solar eclipse occurred on October 23, 1957. A solar eclipse occurs when the Moon passes between Earth and the Sun, thereby totally or partly obscuring the image of the Sun for a viewer on Earth. A total solar eclipse occurs when the Moon's apparent diameter is larger than the Sun's, blocking all direct sunlight, turning day into darkness. Totality occurs in a narrow path across Earth's surface, with the partial solar eclipse visible over a surrounding region thousands of kilometres wide. This total solar eclipse is non-central because gamma is between 0.9972 and 1.0260.

Related eclipses

Solar eclipses of 1957–1960

Tritos series

Metonic series

Notes

References

1957 10 23
1957 in science
1957 10 23
October 1957 events